Linda Chambers-Young (born April 27, 1953) is an American voice actress who voices characters in Japanese anime series, usually in voice productions produced by Funimation. Her most notable roles are Frieza in Dragon Ball Z and Baba in Dragon Ball as well as Genkai in Yu Yu Hakusho.

Her son John Burgmeier works alongside her at Funimation.

Dubbing roles

Anime
 Attack on Titan - Moses's Mother (Ep. 1)
 Black Butler II - Elderly Japanese Women (Ep. 4)
 Black Cat -  Madame Freesia (Ep. 15)
 Blassreiter - Chancellor (Ep. 18)
 Burst Angel - Dr. Quinn (Ep. 22-23)
 C - Control - The Money and Soul of Possibility - Hanabi's Mother (Ep. 9)
 Case Closed - Samantha, Clarissa Bunn, Katherine Sinclair
 Chainsaw Man - Zombie Devil (Ep. 1)
 Dragon Ball - Baba, Arale Norimaki
 Dragon Ball GT - Frieza
 Dragon Ball Z - Frieza, Baba (Ep. 7-34)
 Dragon Ball Z Kai - Frieza (Ep. 1), Baba
 Dragon Ball Super - Baba (Ep. 94), Piiza (eps 13-15, 42)
 Fairy Tail - Porlyusica
 Fullmetal Alchemist: Brotherhood - Shan
Fruits Basket (2019) - Female Coworker 1A, Saki's Grandmother
 The Galaxy Railways - Kinuko Asai
 Ghost Hunt - Hiroe Yoshimi (Ep. 22, 24)
 Gunslinger Girl -Il Teatrino - Izabella D'Angelo (Ep. 6)
 Hell Girl - Tsugumi's Grandmother (Ep. 22)
 Kamisama Kiss - Elderly Woman (Ep. 1, uncredited)
 Michiko & Hatchin - Fortune Teller (Ep. 3, uncredited)
 Mushishi - Shirasawa (Ep. 3)
 My Bride Is a Mermaid - Narrator
 Nichijou - Apartment, Narrator Ep. 4 
 One Piece - Slave 1134 (Ep. 420)  
 One Piece - Movie: Strong World - Xiao's Grandmother
 Rurouni Kenshin (film) - Townsperson
 Rurouni Kenshin: Kyoto Inferno - Grieving Woman
 Shiki - Ikumi Ito
 Trapped in a Dating Sim: The World of Otome Games is Tough for Mobs - Zola
 Yu Yu Hakusho - Genkai

Video games
Dragon Ball series - Frieza (2002–2009), Baba, Fasha
Yu Yu Hakusho: Dark Tournament - Genkai

References

External links

 
 

Living people
American video game actresses
People from Milwaukee
American voice actresses
1953 births
21st-century American women